The 1970 North Carolina Tar Heels football team represented the University of North Carolina at Chapel Hill during the 1970 NCAA University Division football season. The Tar Heels were led by fourth-year head coach Bill Dooley and played their home games at Kenan Memorial Stadium in Chapel Hill, North Carolina. They competed as members of the Atlantic Coast Conference, finishing in second.

The team's star player was running back Don McCauley, who broke  O. J. Simpson's NCAA record for single season rushing yards with 1,720 yards. He was named ACC Player of the Year, was a consensus first-team All-American, and finished ninth in voting for the Heisman Trophy.

Schedule

Roster

References

North Carolina
North Carolina Tar Heels football seasons
North Carolina Tar Heels football